Ma Biao may refer to:

Ma Biao (politician), Communist party politician
Ma Biao (general), Chinese Muslim Lieutenant-General